Commutative algebra is the branch of abstract algebra that studies commutative rings, their ideals, and modules over such rings. Both algebraic geometry and algebraic number theory build on commutative algebra. Prominent examples of commutative rings include polynomial rings, rings of algebraic integers, including the ordinary integers , and p-adic integers.

Research fields 
 Combinatorial commutative algebra
 Invariant theory

Active research areas 
  Serre's multiplicity conjectures
  Homological conjectures

Basic notions 
 Commutative ring
 Module (mathematics)
 Ring ideal, maximal ideal, prime ideal
 Ring homomorphism
Ring monomorphism
Ring epimorphism
Ring isomorphism
 Zero divisor
 Chinese remainder theorem

Classes of rings 
 Field (mathematics)
 Algebraic number field
 Polynomial ring
 Integral domain
 Boolean algebra (structure)
 Principal ideal domain
 Euclidean domain
 Unique factorization domain
 Dedekind domain
 Nilpotent elements and reduced rings
 Dual numbers
 Tensor product of fields
 Tensor product of R-algebras

Constructions with commutative rings 
 Quotient ring
 Field of fractions
 Product of rings
 Annihilator (ring theory)
 Integral closure

Localization and completion 
 Completion (ring theory)
 Formal power series
 Localization of a ring
 Local ring
 Regular local ring
 Localization of a module
 Valuation (mathematics)
 Discrete valuation
 Discrete valuation ring
 I-adic topology
 Weierstrass preparation theorem

Finiteness properties 
 Noetherian ring
 Hilbert's basis theorem
 Artinian ring
 Ascending chain condition (ACC) and descending chain condition (DCC)

Ideal theory 

 Fractional ideal
 Ideal class group
 Radical of an ideal
 Hilbert's Nullstellensatz

Homological properties 
 Flat module
 Flat map
 Flat map (ring theory)
 Projective module
 Injective module
 Cohen-Macaulay ring
 Gorenstein ring
 Complete intersection ring
 Koszul complex
 Hilbert's syzygy theorem
 Quillen–Suslin theorem

Dimension theory 

 Height (ring theory)
 Depth (ring theory)
 Hilbert polynomial
 Regular local ring
Discrete valuation ring
 Global dimension
 Regular sequence (algebra)
 Krull dimension
 Krull's principal ideal theorem

Ring extensions, primary decomposition 
 Primary ideal
 Primary decomposition and the Lasker–Noether theorem
 Noether normalization lemma
 Going up and going down

Relation with algebraic geometry 
 Spectrum of a ring
 Zariski tangent space
 Kähler differential

Computational and algorithmic aspects 
 Elimination theory
 Gröbner basis
 Buchberger's algorithm

Active research areas 
 Serre's multiplicity conjectures	
 homological conjectures

Related disciplines 
 Algebraic number theory
 Algebraic geometry
 Ring theory
 Field theory (mathematics)
 Differential algebra
 Homological algebra

 
Mathematics-related lists
Outlines of mathematics and logic
Wikipedia outlines